Bloomfield is a New Jersey Transit station in Bloomfield, New Jersey along the Montclair-Boonton Line. The station is located in downtown Bloomfield, the second within the municipality, just west of Bloomfield Avenue. This is the second station within the township served on the line after Watsessing Avenue station.

History 
The current Glen Ridge, Bloomfield and Watsessing Avenue stations along the Montclair Branch were all built in 1912 during a grade separation program by the Delaware, Lackawanna and Western Railroad. Bloomfield Station has been on the New Jersey Register of Historic Places since March 17, 1984 and the National Register of Historic Places since June 22, 1984 and as part of the Operating Passenger Railroad Stations Thematic Resource.

The station is the centerpiece of a plan to revitalize Bloomfield's central business district which has been designated a transit-oriented development (TOD) transit village. The former headhouse is privately owned but has not been redeveloped. In 2011, the owner announced they would sell the building, enabling the town to influence future plans.

Bloomfield station is the terminus of the go bus 28, one of the first lines to use bus rapid transit in New Jersey, making limited stops through Newark to Newark Liberty International Airport.

Station layout
The station has two ticket machines on the eastbound platform (to Newark and New York). The low-level side platforms are not accessible.

See also 
List of New Jersey Transit stations
 National Register of Historic Places listings in Essex County, New Jersey

References

External links

 Glenwood Avenue entrance from Google Maps Street View

Bloomfield, New Jersey
Railway stations in the United States opened in 1855
NJ Transit Rail Operations stations
Railway stations in Essex County, New Jersey
Railway stations on the National Register of Historic Places in New Jersey
Former Delaware, Lackawanna and Western Railroad stations
1855 establishments in New Jersey